The Bader Award is a prize for organic chemistry awarded annually by the Royal Society of Chemistry since 1989. The winner, who receives £2,000 and a medal, gives a lecture tour in the UK.

Winners
Source:

See also

 List of chemistry awards

References

Awards of the Royal Society of Chemistry